Bambi is a 1942 Walt Disney animated drama film, centered around a young deer of the same name.

Bambi may also refer to:

Arts and entertainment

Characters 
 Bambi (character), the fawn in Salten's 1923 novel and works based on the novel
 J.D. (Scrubs), on the American comedy-drama Scrubs
 Bambi, a character in the animated TV series Robotboy
 Dr. Bambi Berenbaum, a character in The X-Files episode "War of the Coprophages"

Film and television
 "Bambi" (The Young Ones), a 1984 episode of The Young Ones
 Bambi II, a 2006 Disneytoon followup to the 1942 film
 Bambi (2013 film), a French documentary profiling Marie-Pierre Pruvot

Literature
 Bambi, a 1914 novel by American author Marjorie Benton Cooke
 Bambi, a Life in the Woods, the 1923 novel on which the Disney film is based, by Austro-Hungarian author Felix Salten

Music
 Bambi (Momus album), 2013
 Bambi (Hippo Campus album), 2018
 Bambi (EP), 2021
 "Bambi", a song by Prince on the 1979 album Prince (album)
 "Bambi", a song by Tokyo Police Club on the 2010 album Champ
 "Bambi", a song by Jidenna on the 2017 album The Chief

People

Given name 
 Bambi Sheleg, Israeli journalist and founding editor of the magazine Eretz Acheret
 Bambi Schieffelin, American linguistic anthropologist

Nickname, ring name or stage name 
 Bambi (artist), British street artist
 Bambi Hall, ring name of Samantha Hall (born 1992), Canadian professional wrestler
 Bambi Linn (born Bambina Linnemeier in 1926), American dancer, choreographer and actress
 Bambi Woods (born 1955), pornographic actress and exotic dancer best known as the title character in the 1978 film Debbie Does Dallas
 Lance Alworth (born 1940), American football player
 Laurie Bembenek (1958–2010), American convicted murderer
 Sheila Caffell, one of the alleged victims of Jeremy Bamber, in what became popularly known as the "Bambi" murder case
 Rachel Chalkowski (born 1939), Israeli midwife
 Selina Majors (born 1967), American professional wrestler
 Marie-Pierre Pruvot (born 1935), French transgender entertainer and academic

Other uses 
 BAMBI, a human gene
 Bambi (company), a Serbian food manufacturing company
 Bambi, Angola, a commune in Chipindo, Huíla, Angola
 Bambi Award, a German television award
 Ballistic Missile Boost Intercept, a proposed U.S. anti-ballistic missile system
 15845 Bambi, an asteroid
 Bambi, the name of the Fuldamobil automobile in Argentina
 BAMBI, a charitable foundation established by Rachel Chalkowski

See also 
 Bambee (fl. c. 2000), Desirée Sparre-Enger, Norwegian pop singer
 Who Killed Bambi? (disambiguation)